Albe Vidaković (1 October 1914, Subotica – 18 April 1964, Zagreb) was a Croatian composer, catholic priest and musicologist from Bačka today Vojvodina, Serbia.

Biography
He attended in Rome, but he made his career in Zagreb. He wrote several works and reformed so the usual up to that church music. He also was the founder of the School of Church Music in Zagreb. He died at the age of 49 from a heart attack (in his family most likely genetic in male members).

Selected works

Choral
 Gregoriana
 Caeciliana
 Three-part exhibition Old Slavic (Istarska)
 Gospode duša (Lords soul)
 Prosecution in the Temple

Institutions
 In his honor, the choir of the Basilica of St. Teresa in Subotica his name
 According to him, the Institute of Sacred Music at the Theological Faculty in Zagreb was named: Institute for Church Music Albe Vidaković.

External links 
 Katedralni zbor

1914 births
1964 deaths
Croatian composers
Sacred music composers
20th-century composers